Homer protein homolog 3 is a protein that in humans is encoded by the HOMER3 gene.

Function 

This gene encodes a member of the homer family of dendritic proteins. Members of this family regulate group 1 metabotrophic glutamate receptor function. The encoded protein may be involved in cell growth.

Interactions 

HOMER3 has been shown to interact with TRPC1 and RYR1.

See also 
 HOMER1
 HOMER2

References

Further reading 

 
 
 
 
 
 
 

EVH1 domain